Laetiporus sulphureus is a species of bracket fungus (fungi that grow on trees) found in Europe and North America. Its common names are crab-of-the-woods, sulphur polypore, sulphur shelf, and chicken-of-the-woods. Its fruit bodies grow as striking golden-yellow shelf-like structures on tree trunks and branches. Old fruitbodies fade to pale beige or pale grey. The undersurface of the fruit body is made up of tubelike pores rather than gills.

Laetiporus sulphureus is a saprophyte and occasionally a weak parasite, causing brown cubical rot in the heartwood of trees on which it grows. Unlike many bracket fungi, it is edible when young, although adverse reactions have been reported.

Taxonomy and phylogenetics
Laetiporus sulphureus was first described as Boletus sulphureus by French mycologist Pierre Bulliard in 1789. It has had many synonyms and was finally given its current name in 1920 by American mycologist William Murrill. Laetiporus means "with bright pores" and sulphureus means "the colour of sulphur".

Investigations in North America have shown that there are several similar species within what has been considered L. sulphureus and that the true L. sulphureus may be restricted to regions east of the Rocky Mountains. Phylogenetic analyses of ITS and nuclear large subunit and mitochondrial small subunit rDNA sequences from North American collections have delineated five distinct clades within the core Laetiporus clade. Sulphureus clade I contains white-pored L. sulphureus isolates, while Sulphureus clade II contains yellow-pored L. sulphureus isolates.

Description

The fruiting body emerges directly from the trunk of a tree and is initially knob-shaped, but soon expands to fan-shaped shelves, typically growing in overlapping tiers. It is sulphur-yellow to bright orange in color and has a suedelike texture. Old fruitbodies fade to tan or whitish. The fertile surface is sulphur-yellow with small pores or tubes and produces a white spore print. When fresh, the flesh is succulent with a strong fungal aroma and exudes a yellowish, transparent juice, but soon becomes dry and brittle.

Distribution and habitat

Laetiporus sulphureus is widely distributed across Europe and North America, although its range may be restricted to areas east of the Rockies. It grows on dead or mature hardwoods and has been reported from a very wide variety of host trees, such as Quercus, Prunus, Pyrus, Populus,  Salix, Robinia, and Fagus, occasionally also from conifers, from August to October or later, sometimes as early as June. In the Mediterranean region, this species is usually found on Ceratonia and Eucalyptus. It can usually be found growing in clusters.

Parasitism
The fungus causes brown cubical rot of heartwood in the roots, tree base and stem. After infection, the wood is at first discolored yellowish to red but subsequently becomes reddish-brown and brittle. At the final stages of decay, the wood can be rubbed like powder between the fingers.

Guinness world record
A specimen weighing  was found in the New Forest, Hampshire, United Kingdom, on 15 October 1990.

Palatability

Due to its taste, Laetiporus sulphureus has been called the chicken polypore and chicken-of-the-woods (not to be confused with Grifola frondosa, the so-called hen-of-the-woods).

Many people think that the mushroom tastes like crab or lobster leading to the nickname lobster-of-the-woods. The authors of Mushrooms in Color said that the mushroom tastes good sauteed in butter or prepared in a cream sauce served on toast or rice. It is highly regarded in Germany and North America.

Young specimens are edible if they exude large amounts of a clear to pale yellow watery liquid. Only the young outer edges of larger specimens should be collected, as older portions tend to be tough, unpalatable, and bug-infested. The mushroom should not be eaten raw. Certain species of deer consume this type of mushroom.

Adverse effects
Some people have experienced gastrointestinal upset after eating this mushroom, and it should not be consumed raw.

Severe adverse reactions can occur, including vomiting and fever, in about 10% of the population, but this is now thought to be the result of confusion with morphologically similar species such as Laetiporus huroniensis, which grows on hemlock trees, and L. gilbertsonii, which grows on Eucalyptus.

Bioactivity
The fungus produces the Laetiporus sulphureus lectin (LSL), which exhibits haemolytic and haemagglutination activities. Haemolytic lectins are sugar-binding proteins that lyse and agglutinate cells. These biochemical activities are promoted when bound to carbohydrates.

Cultivation
Compared with species such as Agaricus bisporus (Swiss Brown mushroom) and the oyster mushroom, commercial cultivation of Laetiporus occurs at a much smaller and less mechanized scale.

See also
 Polypore

References

External links
 

Wood-decay fungi
Edible fungi
Fungi described in 1789
Fungi of Europe
Fungi of North America
sulphureus